Be Well, Be Safe, Be Lucky... The Anthology is a compilation of solo and related work by the British guitarist Peter Banks, released by the Peter Banks Musical Estate in March 2018 on the fifth anniversary of Banks' death.

The release draws on Banks' solo releases - The Two Sides of, Instinct, Self-Contained, Reduction and Can I Play You Something? - with additional tracks from other projects, including the Yes tribute album Tales from Yesterday and the Flashback collaboration with Gerard Johnson. "Knights (Revisited)" is a previously unreleased track, based on an unfinished guitar track by Banks and completed posthumously by Tony Kaye, Billy Sherwood and Jay Schellen, who had all separately worked with Banks over the years.

Track listing

Personnel
Credits are adapted from the album's liner notes.

Musicians
Peter Banks: guitar (1-11, 13-15, 20-1, 23-4, 28, 30), guitar synth (4, 6, 9-11), spoken word (16), all parts (12, 17, 22, 25-7, 29)
Ray Bennett: bass (5)
Mike Hough: drums (5)
John Wetton: bass (13)
Steve Hackett: guitar (13)
Phil Collins: drums (13)
Gerald Goff: keys (14)
Gerard Johnson: spoken word (16)
Greg Tupper: alto sax (18)
Brad Stephenson: bass (18)
Mark Craney: drums (18)
Martin Briley: bass (20-1)
Andy McCulloch: drums (20-1)
Cecilia Quino: spoken word (22)
Robert Berry: all other instruments (23)
Tony Kaye: organ (24)
Billy Sherwood: bass (24)
Jay Schellen: drums (24)

Production
Assembled by Johnson (4, 6, 9-11)
Mixed by Johnson (12, 29), Mike Pietrini (24)
Guitar parts engineered by Nick Cottam (24)
Remastered by Pietrini
Poem by Bill Ward

References

2018 compilation albums